Unione Sportiva Dilettantistica Sebinia Alto Sebino (founded in 1940s and know only as Sebinia) is an Italian football team located in Lovere, between Val Camonica and Lake Iseo, in the province of Bergamo.

It currently plays in the Group C of Promozione (Italian 7th level) but in past, named of Sebinia Lovere, it plays two years in Serie C (Italian 3rd level) and three in Promozione Interregionale (at the time Italian 4th level) during the 1940s and 1950s.

History
The club was founded in the 1940s with the name of Sebinia Lovere. It was begun with the intention to become the most important football team of Lake Iseo.

After World War II the team might play, in season 1948, in Serie C, Italian 3rd level. The season started with the 0–0 against Monza. Sebinia arrived 8th but, for the championship reform, was all the same relegated in Promozione Interregionale.

Football clubs in Lombardy